A halloween party is a party, often a costume party, held around Halloween.

Halloween Party may also refer to:
 Hallowe'en Party, a novel by Agatha Christie
 Halloween Party (Fear Street), a book by R. L. Stine
 Halloween Party (album), by Pink Anvil
 "Halloween Party" (song), by Halloween Junky Orchestra